Still Motion is the first studio album by American hip hop artist Natti, a member of the hip hop group CunninLynguists. It was released September 24, 2013 on APOS Music.

Music 
The album is mostly produced by Deacon the Villain and Kno, respectively, with one track produced by SunnyStylez. Guest appearances include Deacon the Villain, Freddie Gibbs, Sha Stimuli and Substantial, among others.

Track listing

References

External links 
 Still Motion at Bandcamp
 Still Motion at Discogs

Hip hop albums by American artists
2013 albums